The following is a list of home video releases for the 1970s–80s TV series The Incredible Hulk.

Television series
Universal Studios Home Entertainment released all 5 seasons of The Incredible Hulk on DVD in Region 1 and 2 from 2006 to 2008. Fabulous Films released all 5 seasons as a Complete Collection box set on Blu Ray for Region 2 in December 2016.

TV movies
The three made-for-TV movies that were released after the TV series ended have been released on DVD. Anchor Bay Entertainment released the first two while 20th Century Fox (successor to New World Pictures) released the final movie.

On May 13, 2008, Anchor Bay Entertainment re-released the first two telefilms on DVD in Region 1 in a one-disc set. This release did not include any of the special features that were on the previous two-disc set.

References

Lists of home video releases
The Incredible Hulk (1978 TV series)